Rocket (Raquel Ervin) is a comic book superhero in materials published by DC Comics.

Publication history

An original character from DC's Milestone Comics imprint, she first appeared in Icon #1 (May 1993) where she was created by Dwayne McDuffie (writer), Denys Cowan, and Mark Bright.

Rocket, along with Milestone Universe and characters, was revived and merged into the DC Universe proper in the late 2000s. The merger treats the characters as new to the universe, ignoring the "Worlds Collide" Milestone/DC crossover of 1994. Rocket reappeared in Justice League of America (vol. 2) #27, written by creator Dwayne McDuffie.

Character biography
Raquel Ervin was born in Paris Island, the poorest, most crime-ridden neighborhood in Dakota. Although she is only the sidekick of the title character, Icon, she is the actual protagonist of the series. She yearned to become a writer ("just like Toni Morrison"), but lacked inspiration until she met Augustus Freeman IV, a corporate lawyer who was secretly a stranded alien with superhuman powers. This occurred while she and her friends were robbing Freeman's home. Raquel convinced Augustus to become the superhero Icon, and to take her on as his sidekick, Rocket. While in costume, she wore a belt that Icon fashioned out of his escape pod's inertia winder, which allowed her to manipulate kinetic energy.

Shortly after she began adventuring with Icon, Raquel discovered that she was pregnant by her ex-boyfriend, Noble (one of the other robbers from the day she met Freeman). She gave birth to a son, Amistad Augustus Ervin, named "Amistad" after the famous ship that brought slaves over from Africa to America, and "Augustus" in honor of Icon. While her pregnancy caused her to give up adventuring for a time, Raquel eventually became a superhero again.

Rocket also assists the Blood Syndicate member Flashback in fighting her addiction to crack cocaine. Rocket was more liberal than Icon, which caused them to clash on a number of occasions. She befriended Static, another teenage superhero from Dakota City. While it has been hinted that someday they might become more than friends, their relationship remained platonic throughout the run of their respective titles.

DC Universe
Following the death of Darkseid (as chronicled in Final Crisis), the space-time continuum was torn asunder, threatening the existence of both the Dakotaverse and the mainstream DC universe. The being known as Dharma was able to use energies that he harnessed from Rift (upon that being's defeat in Worlds Collide) to merge the two universes, creating an entirely new continuity. Only Dharma, Icon and Superman are aware that Dakota and its inhabitants previously existed in a parallel universe. In the revised continuity, Rocket and the other Milestone characters have apparently always existed in the DC Universe. Rocket is still partnered with Icon, who appears to have an existing friendship with Superman and is exempt from prosecution at the hands of the Green Lantern Corps.

Rocket makes her first DCU appearance in Justice League of America (vol. 2) #30, intervening at Icon's request when Batman, Zatanna, Firestorm, and Black Lightning attack several members of the Shadow Cabinet while on a mission in the city of Metropolis. Believing Raquel and the Shadow Cabinet agents have kidnapped former Justice League International member Kimiyo Hoshi (Dr. Light II), Batman immediately attempts to strike Rocket with a batarang, which she easily deflects with her powers. After berating Batman and informing him that Kimiyo is unharmed, Rocket accompanies the Shadow Cabinet Agents and JLA members to the Justice League Satellite, where they aid Icon, Hawkman, and the rest of the Shadow Cabinet and JLA members in a battle with the Shadow Thief. Once Shadow Thief is defeated, Rocket and the other Milestone heroes return home by use of the Shadowslide, with Raquel and Augustus presumably returning to Dakota.

On her Twitter account, writer Gail Simone mentioned that she had planned on using Rocket at some point during her tenure on Wonder Woman, but was not allowed to.
Rocket makes a cameo appearance in Justice League, speaking to Wonder Woman.

Powers and abilities

Powers
All of Rocket's superhuman powers derive from her inertia belt. By using her belt, she can manipulate kinetic energy, granting some super strength, and a kinetic force field.

Skills
Raquel Ervin is a voracious reader and a gifted writer. A former high school gymnast, she is very agile and has quick reflexes. Rocket is also a good hand-to-hand combatant due to her crime fighting experience as Icon's sidekick.

Equipment
All of Rocket's superhuman powers derive from the inertia winder installed in her belt buckle. This device is one of two from Icon's escape pod, the other is installed in Hardware's current suit of armor. When activated, the inertia winder surrounds Rocket in an "inertia field", which absorbs, stores, and redirects any kinetic energy used against it. Rocket's inertia field is normally invisible to the human eye. The field glows purple when it absorbs or releases kinetic energy.

The inertia field primarily serves as a force field that protects her from anything invested with kinetic energy: physical blows, bullets, falls, etc. The maximum amount of kinetic energy Rocket's inertia field can absorb and store is unknown. However, the field nearly reached its limit during Rocket's battle with Oblivion.

Rocket's inertia field normally extends a few inches from her body, but she can expand the field to enclose much greater areas. She once used it to protect a small crowd of people without any loss of its durability.

Rocket can release the field's stored energy, giving her a range of offensive abilities. She can strike with superhuman force by surrounding her fists with kinetic energy. By releasing all the energy in the inertia field, she can stagger powerful beings like Icon with a single blow. Such a feat would leave Rocket defenseless so she prefers to throw less powerful punches. Furthermore, Rocket has moral qualms about using her full store of kinetic energy against normal human opponents.

Rocket can also use kinetic energy to increase the force with which she hurls an object, turning it into a dangerous projectile. For example, she once hurled a bullet with enough force to rival a shot from a high-caliber rifle. This ability is limited to objects which she can lift and toss with her normal strength.

By releasing her store kinetic energy in focus beams, Rocket can project powerful energy blasts from her hands. As with her kinetic punches, the force of these blasts depends on how much kinetic energy she uses.

Recently, Rocket has learned how to use her inertia winder to surround a target within an "inertialess field". This field's kinetic energy nullifies the energy of anything trapped within down to the molecular level. As a result, Rocket can use the inertialess field to effectively immobilize her opponents. In fact, some opponents can fall unconscious in as much as the field prevents oxygen molecules from reaching their lungs. The inertialess field consumes enormous amounts of energy and collapses after a few seconds.

Rocket can fly by releasing her inertia field's kinetic energy beneath her, launching her skyward. Initially, she was not very skilled with this ability and thus could only leap over great distances, but after training from Darnice, Rocket can use her kinetic energy as a means of propulsion for genuine flight. Rocket is capable of flying through narrow corridors and performing complex aerial maneuvers. She can even hover in midair by releasing controlled bursts of kinetic energy beneath her.

Rocket's inertia field has certain weaknesses due to its very nature. First, the field will not activate if a person or object exerts little kinetic energy against it. This makes Rocket vulnerable to stealth attacks, which rely on slower movements and minimal force. Second, the inertia field offers little protection against weapons based on non-kinetic energy like thermal (e.g., flamethrowers) or electrical (e.g., tasers). Finally, Rocket will begin to feel the force of attacks directed against the field if it is overloaded as occurred in her battle with Oblivion.

In other media
 Rocket appears in Young Justice, voiced initially by Kittie in her first three appearances and subsequently by Denise Boutte. This version initially works with Icon before joining the Team. In the second season, Invasion, an adult Rocket joins the Justice League and gets engaged. As of the third season, Outsiders, she has given birth to a son named Amistad. During the fourth season, Phantoms, Rocket grapples with balancing her duties to the League and raising the autistic Amistad on her own.
 Rocket appears as a playable character in Young Justice: Legacy, voiced by Cree Summer.

Analysis
Rocket held liberal views on economic and social issues, which resulted in her often clashing with her conservative partner, Icon. Under her influence, Icon eventually began re-evaluating his views.

W. E. B. Du Bois's The Souls of Black Folk was a major influence in shaping Rocket's liberal views.

Rocket is the first comic book superheroine who is a single teenage mother. The only other one is Mirage, a former member of the Teen Titans. Although Stephanie Brown, the former Batgirl and current Spoiler, gave birth at 15, she gave the child up for adoption.

See also
 Icon

References

Further reading
 The Blacker the Ink: Constructions of Black Identity in Comics and Sequential Art, ed by Frances Gateward and John Jennings (Rutgers University Press, 2015)

External links
 World of Black Heroes: Rocket Biography
 International Heroes: Rocket
 Rocket at the DC Database Project

African-American superheroes
Black people in comics
Characters created by Dwayne McDuffie
Comics characters introduced in 1993
DC Comics characters with superhuman strength
DC Comics female superheroes
DC Comics sidekicks
Fictional characters with energy-manipulation abilities